Seppo Vaihela (born 1953 in Pori, Finland) is a Swedish bandy and association football executive and previously bandy and football player.

Vaihela played bandy in the clubs IFK Kungälv and Ale-Surte BK and he also played in the Sweden national bandy team. He also played football, but in lower divisions. After his player's career, he was president for IFK Kungälv and then he was president for Swedish Bandy Association in 2002-2006 and for a while also vice president for the Federation of International Bandy. Later, he returned to football to take up the presidency for football club IFK Göteborg.

Vaihela moved from Finland to Sweden at the age of 2. He is the son of Jorma Vaihela, who played in the Finland national football team.

References

Swedish bandy executives
Swedish bandy players
Association football executives
Swedish people of Finnish descent
IFK Kungälv players
Surte BK players
1953 births
Living people